Andrzej Maj may refer to:
 Andrzej Maj (1869–1934), Polish politician
 Andrzej Maj (1950–2005), Polish film and theatre director